South Park Reigate Football Club are an English football club based in Reigate, Surrey. The club is affiliated to the Surrey County Football Association.

History 
The club was founded in 1897 and joined the Redhill and District Football League as a founding member.  The facilities of the club were very basic to start with, with the club playing on a sports field between Crescent and Church Roads.  1925 brought a partnership with the local cricket club which formed the South Park Sports Association, the aim of the association to improve athletic facilities for the two clubs and as a result the people of South Park.

The new association found suitable land on Whitehall Lane, the current home of South Park F.C., and purchased four acres through subscriptions and door to door collections.  Further purchases of two and four acres respectively ensured that the ground would remain a permanent sports home by vesting them to the National Playing Fields Association.  The entire allotment was renamed "King George's Field" in 1935.

The club took a hit during and immediately after World War II, however an air raid shelter on King George's Field proved to be a defining feature of the landscape for the club in its rebound after the war.  Donations ensured that amenities were added to the shelter, such as a clubhouse, showers and toilets, to provide the club much needed improvements to fulfill their sporting aspirations. After this period the club remained playing in the local leagues, where they achieved some success over the years.

In 2001, nearby club Reigate Town Football Club moved into South Park and merged with the current club.  As a result, the club was renamed South Park & Reigate Town Football Club until 2003 when they reverted to South Park Football Club. Even more renovations were made to King George's Field with the installation of floodlights and new changing rooms.

2006 saw the club's promotion from the Crawley & District League to the Combined Counties Football League Division One.  The club's first ever FA Vase match was held in 2008–09, a second qualifying round 2–1 home defeat to Shoreham.

In 2010, South Park participated in the FA Cup for the first time. They beat Greenwich Borough and Horsham YMCA to set up a tie with Cray Wanderers. That season also saw the club gain promotion to the Combined Counties Football League Premier Division, and won a cup double of the Combined Counties Division one cup and the Surrey County premier Cup.

In the 2011–12 season South Park reached the last 32 of the FA Vase competition where they were eventually overcome by the holders Whitley Bay.

In the 2012–13 season the club achieved its best ever performance in the FA Cup, reaching the fourth qualifying round, where they were beaten 3–0 at home by Metropolitan Police.

South Park updated their badge in July 2018. In October 2018, manager Mick Sullivan, who joined at the start of the season, left the club. Jay Lovett was named manager later that month. In November 2019, Martin Dynan replaced Lovett. Harrison Williams took charge of the club in February 2022.
In November 2022, Harrison left the club and his assistant Tom Cope took over the side and was named the First Team Manager. 

South Park renamed themselves South Park Reigate in July 2022, the decision was made by the club as they believe it will enhance their profile locally as well as in the wider football community.

Ground 
South Park play their home games at Whitehall Lane, South Park, Reigate, Surrey RH2 8LG.

Non-playing staff 
As of November 2018.

Honours 
Combined Counties Football League Premier Division
Champions 2013–14
Surrey FA Saturday Premier Cup:
 Winners 2010–11
Combined Counties Football League Premier Cup
Runners up 2012–13
Combined Counties Football League Division One Cup:
 Winners 2010–11

Records 
Highest League Position: 1st in Combined Counties Premier Division 2013–14
FA Cup best performance: Fourth qualifying round 2012–13
FA Vase best performance: Fourth round 2011–12
FA Trophy best performance: Second round 2016-17
Highest Attendance: 643 vs Metropolitan Police October 20, 2012

See also
South Park F.C. players
South Park F.C. managers

References

External links 
 Official website
 South Park at the Isthmian League
 

 
Isthmian League
Combined Counties Football League
Association football clubs established in 1897
Football clubs in Surrey
1897 establishments in England
Football clubs in England
Reigate
Crawley and District Football League
Redhill and District Saturday Football League